The Ministry of European Integration of the Republic of Serbia is the ministry in the Government of Serbia which is in the charge of the accession of Serbia to the European Union. The current minister is Tanja Miščević, in office since 22 October 2022.

It was founded in June 2017 in order to meet the increased workload in the process of accession of Serbia to the European Union. With its founding, the European Integration Office was dissolved.

List of ministers
Political Party:

References

External links
 n] 

European Integration
2017 establishments in Serbia
Ministries established in 2017
Ministers and ministries responsible for European affairs